Spooneromyces is a genus of fungi in the family Pyronemataceae. Named for Brian Spooner (mycologist).

Pyronemataceae
Pezizales genera